The Clovis Central Fire Station at 320 Mitchell St. in Clovis, Curry County, New Mexico is an Early Commercial-style building that was built in 1929 and reflected confidence in the city's prospects at the beginning of the Great Depression. It was listed on the National Register of Historic Places in 1987.

It has also been known as the Clovis City Hall and Fire Station. In these functions it replaced the 1908 Clovis City Hall and Fire Station (which is also listed on the National Register). It is on the same block as the City Hall and Municipal Court building.

It is a two-story building with a truncated hipped roof and is partially flat-roofed. Its walls include blonde brick laid in running bond and light gray/tan concrete details.

References

Fire stations on the National Register of Historic Places in New Mexico
National Register of Historic Places in Curry County, New Mexico
Early Commercial architecture in the United States
Buildings and structures completed in 1929
Clovis, New Mexico